Far from the Madding Crowd is a 1998 drama television film adaptation of Thomas Hardy's 1874 novel of the same name.

Critical reception
Will Joyner of The New York Times wrote a positive review of the adaptation: "Strangely, and to its great credit, this new Far From the Madding Crowd, which was produced by Granada Television in Britain and WGBH-TV in Boston, does not simply survive the viewer's tendency to compare and second-guess; it thrives upon it. At almost every turn of the deliciously gradual tale of romantic chaos, the new version is just as visually striking as the 1967 film -- some of the locations are virtually identical -- and is more naturally rendered dramatically, with a rough language truer to Hardy's blend of poetry and rural speech."

References

External links
 

1998 British television series debuts
1998 British television series endings
1990s British drama television series
ITV television dramas
1990s romantic drama television series
Films based on works by Thomas Hardy
1990s British television miniseries
Television shows set in England
Television shows based on British novels
Television series by ITV Studios
Television shows produced by Granada Television
English-language television shows
Television shows based on works by Thomas Hardy